Regiment Molopo was an armoured regiment of the South African Army. As a reserve unit, it had a status roughly equivalent to that of a British Army Reserve or United States Army National Guard unit.

History

Origin
Regiment Molopo was raised in 1960 as an armoured regiment equipped with armoured cars. In 1986 Regiment Molopo was changed from an armoured car unit to a tank regiment.

Border War
Regiment Molopo saw active service in the South West Africa/Angola campaign. The regiment participated in Operation Askari and Operation Moduler. It provided elements to combine with Regiment Mooirivier to form a composite unit of Olifant tanks under the command of Task Force Victor.

Brigade affiliation
Regiment Molopo was affiliated with 73 Motorised Brigade from 1983 until 1991.

Disbandment
Regiment Molopo closed around 1995 and its memorabilia and colours were transferred to the Pretoria Regiment for safekeeping.

Regimental symbols

Dress Insignia

Unit colours

Operations 
Regiment Molopo participated in a number of operations including :
 Operation Askari 
 Operation Moduler

Leadership

References

South African Army
Armoured regiments of South Africa
Military units and formations established in 1960
Military units and formations of South Africa in the Border War
Military units and formations disestablished in 1991